The Brazilian Sport Horse or  is a modern Brazilian  breed of warmblood horse. It was bred as a sport riding horse for competitive equestrian sports, particularly show jumping, dressage and three-day eventing.

History 

Breeding of the Brazilian Sport Horse began in the 1970s. Local Crioulo mares were put to stallions from a wide variety of sporting breeds, among them Andalusian, Anglo-Argentine, Belgian Warmblood, Hanoverian, Holsteiner, Irish Hunter, Oldenburger, Selle Français,  Thoroughbred, Trakehner and Westphalian stock.

Characteristics 

The coat is most often bay, dark bay or chestnut.

Uses 

Like other sport horse breeds, the Brazilian Sport Horse was bred and selected specifically for equestrian competition, particularly in show jumping, dressage and three-day eventing.

References 

Horse breeds
Horse breeds originating in Brazil